David Wayne McClain (born October 22, 1965) is an American drummer. He is best known as the former drummer for the American heavy metal band, Machine Head. He joined the band in 1995 and left the band in 2018 after 23 years in the band. He replaced Chris Kontos when the latter left shortly after their first album, Burn My Eyes. He was formerly a member of S.A. Slayer (not to be confused with the California-based Slayer), Riot offshoot Narita, Turbin, Catalepsy, Murdercar (featuring producer Ross Robinson), Ministers of Anger (Dave Clemmons). Currently he has rejoined Sacred Reich in 2018, which he originally played for from 1991–1995.

McClain has been a vegan since 2017.

Endorsements 
He currently endorses Remo drumheads, Yamaha drums and hardware and Zildjian cymbals. He also uses Zildjian Dave McClain signature Drumsticks.
He previously endorsed Tama, Pearl and DDrum.

Discography

Albums and EPs 
 S.A. Slayer
 Prepare to Die EP (Rainforest Records, 1983)
 Go for the Throat (Under den Linden Records, 1988)

 Murdercar
 unreleased album (1990)

 Sacred Reich
 A Question EP (Hollywood Records, 1991)
 Independent (Hollywood Records, 1993)
 Heal (Metal Blade Records 1996)
 Awakening (Metal Blade Records, 2019)

 Machine Head
 The More Things Change... (Roadrunner Records, 1997)
 The Burning Red (Roadrunner Records, 1999)
 Supercharger (Roadrunner Records, 2001)
 Through the Ashes of Empires (Roadrunner Records, 2003)
 The Blackening (Roadrunner Records, 2007)
 Unto the Locust (Roadrunner Records, 2011)
 Bloodstone & Diamonds (Nuclear Blast, 2014)
 Catharsis (Nuclear Blast, 2018)

 Compilations
 with Juggernaut
In the Blood of Virgins, Metal Massacre VII (Metal Blade Records, 1986)
 with Murdercar
Mirage of Blood, Metal Massacre X (Metal Blade Records, 1989)
 with Ministers of Anger
The Great Escape, Metal Massacre XI (Metal Blade Records, 1991)

References 

1965 births
20th-century American drummers
American male drummers
American heavy metal drummers
Juggernaut (band) members
Living people
Machine Head (band) members
Male drummers
Musicians from San Antonio
20th-century American male musicians